Jelena Špirić (Serbian Cyrillic: Јелена Шпирић; born 11 August 1983, in Belgrade) is a former Serbian women's basketball player and she played at forward position for the University of Nebraska, Lincoln and national team of Serbia.

UMass Lowell and Nebraska statistics

Source

Sources
Profile at eurobasket.com
 Profile at huskers.com

References

1983 births
Living people
Basketball players from Belgrade
Serbian women's basketball players
Small forwards
Serbian expatriate basketball people in the United States
Nebraska Cornhuskers women's basketball players
Beşiktaş women's basketball players
ŽKK Partizan players
ŽKK Crvena zvezda players
ŽKK Radivoj Korać players
ŽKK Vojvodina players